Strongylognathus rehbinderi is a species of ant in the genus Strongylognathus. It is endemic to Georgia.

References

Strongylognathus
Endemic fauna of Georgia (country)
Hymenoptera of Europe
Insects described in 1904
Taxonomy articles created by Polbot